Association Sportive Kondzo is a Congolese football club based in Brazzaville, Republic of the Congo. They play in the Congo Premier League.

Performance in CAF competitions
CAF Confederation Cup: 1 appearance
2014 – First Round

External links
Team profile – The Biggest Football Archive of the World
FC Konzo – Congo

Football clubs in the Republic of the Congo
Sports clubs in Brazzaville